Pachylobus is a genus of flowering plants belonging to the family Burseraceae.

Its native range is Nigeria to Zambia.

Species:

Pachylobus bampsianus 
Pachylobus buettneri 
Pachylobus camerunensis 
Pachylobus ebatom 
Pachylobus edulis 
Pachylobus heterotrichus 
Pachylobus igaganga 
Pachylobus klaineanus 
Pachylobus ledermannii 
Pachylobus letestui 
Pachylobus macrophyllus 
Pachylobus normandii 
Pachylobus osika 
Pachylobus pubescens 
Pachylobus tessmannii 
Pachylobus trapnellii 
Pachylobus villiersianas

References

Burseraceae
Burseraceae genera